Mariara is a city in Carabobo State, Venezuela, the shire town of the Diego Ibarra Municipality. It was founded by bishop Mariano Marti on 3 December 1781.

History 

Europeans found Carib tribes when they arrived to this region in the middle of the 16th century. 
Conquistador Vicente Díaz explored the area around 1555 and fought against some Native Americans around Mariara.

During the Colony, the Tovar family had large plantations here. Bishop Mariano Martí founded Mariara officially on 3 December 1781. Alexander von Humboldt visited in 1800.

The Ayundamiento de Valencia was created in 1810, comprising nine regions: Valencia, Los Guayos, Puerto Cabello, Ocumare de la Costa, Turmero, Guacara, Güigüe, Maracay and Mariara.

Geography

Climate

References 

Cities in Carabobo
Populated places established in 1781